Manuel Gondra Pereira (1 January 1871 – 8 March 1927) was the 21st President of Paraguay who served from 25 November 1910 to 11 January 1911 and again from 15 August 1920 to 31 October 1921. Born in Buenos Aires, he was also an author, a journalist and a member of the Liberal Party. His first presidency was ended by the rise of Albino Jara, while his second presidency by chaos in the Paraguayan Civil War of 1922, of which he led the Gondrist faction to victory.

Manuel Gondra died on 8 March 1927 in Asunción.

Early life and career 
Manuel Gondra was born on the 1 January 1871, Buenos Aires. Although he did well in school and was reportedly a good student, he chose to leave schooling, never achieving a diploma. Rather, he chose to be a self-taught scholar of many subjects, including the social sciences, history of the Americas, and geography. He received some success in this field. However, his career as an intellectual came to a pause when he joined the Revolution of 1904 on the side of the Liberals. After this, he became the Plenipotentiary ambassador to Brazil in 1905. His diligence would see him later be assigned as the Minister of the Interior, then Minister of War and Navy, and then Minister of Foreign Affairs of Paraguay.

At some point he was also made ambassador to the United States.

Presidential career

First tenure 
Manuel Gondra's initial candidacy was widely supported by both intellectuals and the citizenry of Paraguay. He assumed office on 25 November 1910.

Gondra's presidency came to an end when Colonel Albino Jara launched a coup against him on 17 August 1911, despite sharing similar political agenda. This was a result of the collapsing liberal movement in Paraguay.

Second tenure 
After much of the chaos following Jara's coup subsided, Manuel Gondra sought re-election. His campaign was met with victory, and he assumed office on 15 August 1920. However, this was not without its controversy. Immediately following, the supporters of the opposing candidate, schaereristas, and their leader Eduardo Schaerer (who Gondra formerly served under) erupted into violence, in what became the Paraguayan Civil War. In this emerging civil war, Eduardo Schaerer pressured the Interior Minister José Guggiari (a close ally) to resign, but Gondra resisted. For this pressure and lost power, he was forced into resignition on 31 October 1921.

References

1871 births
1927 deaths
People from Buenos Aires
Paraguayan people of Basque descent
Liberal Party (Paraguay) politicians
Presidents of Paraguay
Foreign Ministers of Paraguay
Paraguayan diplomats
Paraguayan male writers